The PA-25 Pawnee is an agricultural aircraft produced by Piper Aircraft between 1959 and 1981. It remains a widely used aircraft in agricultural spraying and is also used as a tow plane, or tug, for launching gliders or for towing banners.  In 1988, the design rights and support responsibility were sold to Latino Americana de Aviación of Argentina.

Design and development
Most agricultural aircraft before 1949 were converted military aircraft and it was in that year that Fred Weick, based at Texas A&M University, designed a dedicated agricultural aircraft: the AG-1.  The AG-1 first flew on 1 December 1950.

During 1953, Fred Weick was approached by Piper to become a consultant on the agricultural version of the PA-18, the PA-18A, in particular to design and test a distributor for dust and seeds. A few weeks later, Piper sponsored Texas A&M University to design a dedicated agricultural aircraft based on the AG-1 but to use as many PA-18A and PA-22 components as possible.  The resulting design, the AG-3, was smaller than the AG-1 and had a steel tube fuselage which was fabric covered. The AG-3 was a single-seat, low-wing monoplane with the wings braced to the fuselage with struts. It had a conventional landing gear with a tailwheel and was powered by a 135 hp engine. The single seat was placed high in the fuselage to give the best visibility and an 800 lb-capacity hopper was fitted in front of the cockpit.

The AG-3 made its maiden flight in November 1954. The aircraft's flying tests were successful and, in 1957, Weick was invited to join Piper at Vero Beach, and the AG-3 was renamed the PA-25 Pawnee.  The engine was upgraded to a 150 hp Lycoming O-320-A1A engine. Two pre-production aircraft were built at Vero Beach in 1957 and production started at Lock Haven, Pennsylvania, in May 1959.

In 1962, another prototype was built at Vero Beach with a 235 hp Lycoming O-540-B2B5 engine and production aircraft were produced at Lock Haven from 1962. In 1964, the Pawnee B was introduced with a larger hopper and improved dispersal gear. The Pawnee C of 1967 was fitted with oleo shock-absorbers and other improvements; also in 1967, a 260 hp variant was introduced.

Early models of the Pawnee had a single fuel tank located between the agricultural hopper and the engine.  The National Transportation Safety Board recommended to Piper Aircraft that the early model PA-25's with a fiberglass fuel tank be retrofitted with a rubber fuel cell to minimize the chance of catastrophic failure and fire resulting from a crash.

In 1974, the Pawnee D was introduced, with the fuel tanks moved from the fuselage to the wings; the 260 hp variant was also available with either a fixed pitch or constant-speed propeller. Although still the same design as the "D", the 1980 and 1981 production aircraft were marketed as the Pawnee.  The final production aircraft was completed at Lock Haven on 22 March 1981, the last of 5,167 Pawnees.

A useful design aspect was the ability to carry a mechanic on a jump seat fitted in the hopper to assist with operations at remote stations.

On April 15, 1988, Piper Aircraft, Inc. officially sold the PA-25 series aircraft to Latino Americana de Aviación S.A in Argentina.  The sale included all drawings, engineering data, parts inventory, tools, catalogs, and manuals.  All support of any nature became the responsibility of the new owners.

In 2019, Australia's Civil Aviation Safety Authority formally approved the issuing to eTugs of Certificates of Airworthiness in the Limited category for the purpose of glider towing. An etug is a PA-25 where the Lycoming engine has been replaced with a General Motors LS automotive engine. The advantages for glider towing, compared to a Lycoming powered PA-25, include a greater rate of climb, reduced fuel consumption, the elimination of shock cooling (since the LS is water-cooled rather than air-cooled) and a less costly maintenance regime.

Variants
AG-3
Prototype built at Texas A&M University.

PA-25-150 Pawnee
Initial production version fitted with a  Lycoming O-320 engine. Payload of  powders or  liquids.

PA-25-235 Pawnee B
Fitted with a  Lycoming O-540-B2B5 six-cylinder engine.

PA-25-235 and PA-25-260 Pawnee C
The Pawnee C was an upgraded version of the 'B' model and was available with a 235hp or a 260hp high compression version of the O-540 engine and either a fixed pitch or constant speed propeller. The fuselage of the Pawnee C featured a quickly detachable 'turtledeck' panel to ease the rinsing out of spilt corrosive agents from the fuselage structure and to facilitate servicing and inspection of components housed in the rear section of the fuselage.

PA-25-235 and PA-25-260 Pawnee D
The Pawnee D was also powered by a Lycoming O-540 of 260hp but featured fuel tanks fitted in the outer wings and metal covered ailerons and flaps. From 1980 it was known as the PA-25-235 Pawnee.

eTug
A modified PA-25 powered by a General Motors LS automotive engine driving a three-bladed propeller. Other differences include a belted propeller speed reduction unit.

Accidents and incidents
9 August 1974 a crop-spraying Pawnee was involved in a fatal mid-air collision in Norfolk, UK with a Royal Air Force McDonnell Douglas Phantom II FGR2.
24 April 1996 a Piper PA-25-150 (modified by extending the canopy forward and installing a passenger seat in the hopper area) being used to develop a supplemental type certificate (STC) was involved in a fatal crash near Buffalo, MO in which an FAA flight test engineer was killed but the test pilot survived.
29 February 2004 a glider tug Pawnee crashed and was destroyed by post-crash fire soon after takeoff at Parham Airfield, West Sussex, England. The investigation concluded that the pilot, who was 71, had died in flight from an undiagnosed heart condition. When the Pawnee diverted from its expected course the glider instructor took control from the student, released the tow cable, and landed their aircraft safely; the tug pilot was the only fatality.
6 February 2010 a glider-towing PA-25-235 Pawnee was involved in a multiple-fatality accident near Boulder Municipal Airport (in Colorado, USA), after colliding with a Cirrus SR20.  All occupants of both powered craft died; one in the Pawnee, two in the Cirrus; however, the Schweizer 2-32 glider released and landed safely.
1 March 2019 a Piper PA-25 towing a banner crashed into a condominium building in Fort Lauderdale Florida. The pilot was killed.
7 May 2022 a Piper PA-25-235, owned by the Wanganui Manawatu Gliding Club in New Zealand, and operating out of the Feilding Aerodrome, encountered difficulties when towing a glider aloft, and crashed into trees. The pilot, 74 year old Ronald Sanders, died of his injuries on 30 May 2022.

Specifications (PA-25-235 Pawnee)

Data from: Macdonald Aircraft Handbook

General characteristics
 Crew: One
 Capacity: 150 US gal (568 L) or 1,500 lb (545 kg) of chemicals
 Length: 24 ft 9 in (7.55 m)
 Wingspan: 36 ft 2 in (11.02 m)
 Height: 7 ft 2 in (2.19 m)
 Wing area: 183 ft2 (17.0 m2)
 Empty: 1,457 lb (662 kg)
 Loaded: 2,900 lb (1,317 kg)
 Maximum takeoff: 2,900 lb (1,317 kg)
 Powerplant: 1 x Lycoming O-540-B2B5, 235 hp (175 kW)

Performance
 Maximum speed: 107 kts or 124 mph (188 km/h)
 Range: 300 miles (500 km)
 Service ceiling: 13,000 ft (3,963 m)
 Rate of climb: 630 ft/min (192 m/min)(at MTOW)
 Wing loading: 15.9 lb/ft2 (77.5 kg/m2)
 Power/Mass: 0.0810 hp/lb (0.133 kW/kg)

See also
Related development:
Texas A&M College AG-1
Gippsland Aeronautics PA-25-235/A9 'Fatman'
Piper PA-36 Pawnee Brave

Comparable aircraft:
Aero Boero 260AG
Air Tractor AT-300
Ayres Thrush
CallAir A-9
Cessna 188 AgWagon 
 Embraer EMB-202 "Ipanema"
Grumman Ag Cat
 PZL-106 Kruk
 PZL-Mielec M-18 Dromader
 Zlin Z-37 Čmelák

Notes

Bibliography

 Green, William. Aircraft Handbook. London. Macdonald & Co. (Publishers) Ltd., 1964.
Peperell, Roger and Smith, Colin. Piper Aircraft and their forerunners Tonbridge, Kent, England Air-Britain 1987. 
 Taylor, John W. R. Jane's All the World's Aircraft 1962–63. London: Sampson Low, Marston & Company, Ltd., 1962.

External links

 PA-25 Pawnee fliegerszene.de

Pawnee
Single-engined tractor aircraft
Low-wing aircraft
1950s United States agricultural aircraft
Glider tugs
Aircraft first flown in 1957